Mr. Khadang: Animals are Human (English: Mr. Chatterbox) is a 2017 Indian Meitei language film directed by Chou En Lai and produced by Laishram Premila, under the banner of Anouba Maikei Productions. It stars Gurumayum Bonny in the titular role. Mr. Khadang won the Best Feature Film Award at the 7th SSS MANIFA 2018. It was released at Range Ground, Yaiskul on 1 October 2017. It was also premiered at Shankar Lal Auditorium, North Campus, University of Delhi, on 20 August 2017.

Synopsis
The film centers around Mani, also known as Mr. Khadang for being a chatterbox, but what he speaks is always the truth. A lie once told due to certain circumstances makes him to be very wrongly taken by his girlfriend Thadoi. The series of events that follows due to the lie told, changes him to a completely different person, ultimately proving everyone that Mr. Khadang is not a worthless person.

Cast
 Gurumayum Bonny as Maibam Mani Meitei aka Mr. Khadang
 Bala Hijam as Thadoi
 Redy Yumnam as Thanil
 Ithoi Oinam as Langlen
 Thingom Pritam as Sanatomba, Mani's brother
 Ningthoujam Rina as Santomba's wife
 Longjam Ongbi Lalitabi as Mani's mother
 Idhou as Khura
 Surjit Saikhom as Thoiba
 Kajal Mutum as Thaja
 Nandakumar Nongmaithem as Dr. Loya, Surgeon
 Soma Laishram as Maibam Likla, Mani's Daughter (Cameo Appearance/Narrator)
 Ratan Lai as Journalist (Cameo Appearance)

Accolades
Mr. Khadang won awards at the 7th Sahitya Seva Samiti Awards (SSS MANIFA) 2018, including the Best Feature Film Award.

Soundtrack
Tony Aheibam composed the soundtrack for the film and Sairem Paikhomba Meitei wrote the lyrics. The song is titled Punshi Lamjel.

References

2010s Meitei-language films
2017 films